The second season of Your Face Sounds Familiar Kids was a singing and impersonation competition for child celebrities on ABS-CBN. Gary Valenciano, Sharon Cuneta, and Ogie Alcasid reprised their jury duties. Jed Madela, a judge in the first and second seasons of the regular edition, and Nyoy Volante, season 1 runner-up, served as the mentors of the contestants. Billy Crawford also returns as the host.

The show replaced the sixth season of Pilipinas Got Talent. It began airing on May 5, 2018.

After 16 weeks of performances, Keifer Sanchez, Mackie Empuerto, and Francis Concepcion, collectively known as the TNT Boys emerged as the winner, garnering 100% of the judges' and public votes.

The season was re-aired from January 2019 to February 2019 every Weeknights at 7:15 PM on Jeepney TV.

Development 
Several teasers were aired in the network from April 2018 onwards. Jed Madela and Nyoy Volante were later revealed to be the kids' mentors. The show premiered on May 5, 2018, and ran until August 19, 2018.

In Week 15, the show had a duet weekend, in which the contestants of the season had a duet with the contestants of the prior season, however, as Xia Vigor had prior commitments, Bella Echarri filled in for Vigor. After the Grand Showdown, the show held a special thanksgiving concert titled All-Star Reunion Special.

Prize 
Every week, the winner will win a cash prize of 100,000 pesos, half will be given to his or her chosen charity. The grand prize of the competition is a 1 million peso cash prize. Other prizes for the grand winner include a gadget showcase and a house and lot.

Hosts, Judges, and mentors

Host
Billy Crawford returns as the main host.

Online show hosts
The online companion show Your Face Sounds Familiar Kids: Breaktime is hosted by season 1 contestants Sam Shoaf, AC Bonifacio and Awra Briguela. It airs simultaneously with the main show, being streamed live on both the official Facebook page and YouTube channel of the show.

Breaktime features behind-the-scene exclusives which are usually not aired on the main show. It also includes interviews of the cast and live comments/tweets from the viewers.

Judges
The judges, dubbed as "The Jury" in the show:

The Jury
 Ogie Alcasid
 Sharon Cuneta
 Gary Valenciano

Guest judges
Juror Gary Valenciano missed most of the season due to his heart surgery and was temporarily replaced by the mentors.
Nyoy Volante and Jed Madela (Valenciano's replacement judges for Week 3 to Week 10)
Nyoy Volante (Valenciano's replacement judge for Week 11 and 12)

Mentors
In this season, Jed Madela (vocals) and Nyoy Volante (choreography and movement) serves as the kids' mentors, replacing Annie Quintos of The Company for vocals and Georcelle Dapat of the G-Force for choreography.

Guest Mentors
Season 1 finalist Jay R co-mentored with Jed Madela for Week 11 and replaced him for Week 12, 13 and 14.

Performers 
The following are participating performers for the competition. They were revealed on April 17, 2018.
 Chun-sa Jung – Child actress (Ang Bulilit Kikay)
 Esang de Torres – Singer/Stage actress (Ang Kiddie Kontesera)
 Krystal Brimner – Singer/actress (The Precious Darling)
 Marco Masa – Child actor (Ang Anghel ng Masa)
 Noel Comia Jr. – Singer/Stage actor (Ang Poging Lodi)
 Onyok Pineda – Child actor (Ang Bibong Astig)
 Sheena Belarmino – Singer/dancer (Ang Inday Wonder)
 TNT Boys (Keifer Sanchez, Mackie Empuerto, and Francis Concepcion) – Singing Trio (The Big Shot Trio)

Results summary 
The table below shows the corresponding points earned each week.

Legend

Performances
The eight performances are divided into two nights – four contestants perform during Saturdays and the remaining four during Sundays.

Week 1 (May 5 & 6)
Episode hashtag
 #YourFaceSoundsFamiliarKids (Saturday)
 #YFSFKids (Sunday)

Week 2 (May 12 & 13)
Episode hashtag
 #YFSFK2ThumbsUp (Saturday)
 #YFSFKMothersDay (Sunday)

Week 3 (May 19 & 20)
Gary Valenciano had an emergency heart surgery weeks before the taping. Mentors Jed Madela and Nyoy Volante served as the guest judges until week 12. They gave stars to the kid celebrity performers as one.

Guest jurors 
 Nyoy Volante and Jed Madela (replacement for Gary Valenciano; score counts as one)

Episode hashtag
 #YFSFAmazingKids (Saturday)
 #YFSFBoomBoom (Sunday)

Week 4 (May 26 & 27)

Guest jurors 
 Nyoy Volante and Jed Madela (replacement for Gary Valenciano; score counts as one)

Episode hashtag
 #YFSFKDreamComeTrue (Saturday)
 #YFSFKFeelNaFeel (Sunday)

Week 5 (June 2 & 3)

Guest jurors 
 Nyoy Volante and Jed Madela (replacement for Gary Valenciano; score counts as one)

Episode hashtag
 #YFSFKPasiklaban (Saturday)
 #YFSFKMagalingMagaling (Sunday)

Week 6 (June 9 & 10)

Guest jurors 
 Nyoy Volante and Jed Madela (replacement for Gary Valenciano; score counts as one)

Episode hashtag
 #YFSFKTodoTuwa (Saturday)
 #YFSFKHighestLevel (Sunday)

Week 7 (June 16 & 17)

Guest jurors 
 Nyoy Volante and Jed Madela (replacement for Gary Valenciano; score counts as one)

Episode hashtag
 #YFSFKGigilSaSaya (Saturday)
 #YFSFKArawNiTatay (Sunday)

Week 8 (June 23 & 24)

Guest jurors 
 Nyoy Volante and Jed Madela (replacement for Gary Valenciano; score counts as one)

Episode hashtag
 #YFSFKSorpreSabado (Saturday)
 #YFSFKFamiLinggo (Sunday)

Week 9 (June 30 & July 1)

Guest jurors 
 Nyoy Volante and Jed Madela (replacement for Gary Valenciano; score counts as one)

Episode hashtag
 #YFSFKSaturYey (Saturday)
 #YFSFKLingGoals (Sunday)

Week 10 (July 7 & 8)
Theme
 OPM week

Guest jurors 
 Nyoy Volante and Jed Madela (replacement for Gary Valenciano; score counts as one)

Episode hashtag
 #YFSFKLovesOPM (Saturday)
 #YFSFKPinoyMusic (Sunday)

Week 11 (July 14 & 15)
Guest jurors 
 Nyoy Volante (replacement for Gary Valenciano)

Guest mentors
 Jay R (co-mentoring with Jed Madela)

Episode hashtag
 #YFSFKSabaDoIt (Saturday)
 #YFSFKMagalinggo (Sunday)

Week 12 (July 21 & 22)
Guest jurors 
 Nyoy Volante (replacement for Gary Valenciano)

Guest mentors
 Jay R (replacement for Jed Madela)

Episode hashtag
 #YFSFKKumpleTuwa (Saturday)
 #YFSFKTodoTalento (Sunday)

Week 13 (July 28 & 29)
Guest mentors
 Jay R (replacement for Jed Madela)

Episode hashtag
 #YFSFKGVReturns (Saturday)
 #YFSFKBigayTodo (Sunday)

Note

Week 14 (August 4 & 5)
Guest Mentors
 Jay R (replacement for Jed Madela)
Episode hashtag
 #YFSFKAgostoKoTo (Saturday)
 #YFSFKWonderKids (Sunday)

Week 15 (August 11 & 12)
Challenge
 Duet with the season 1 contestants

Episode hashtag
 #YFSFKSabaDuets (Saturday)
 #YFSFKRoadToGrandShowdown (Sunday)

Finals: Week 16 (August 18 & 19) 
The finale was held in UP Theater, University of the Philippines Diliman instead of Newport Performing Arts Theater. All eight contestants were chosen to compete for the grand prize.

 Non-competition performances

Joshua Garcia and Julia Barretto - "No Touch/Hahabol-Habol"

Episode hashtag
 #YFSFKGrandShowdown (Saturday)
 #YFSFKGrandWinner (Sunday)

Notes

All-Star Reunion Special (August 25 & 26)
The All-Star Reunion Special thanksgiving concert was held on August 20 at the UP Theater, The All Star Reunion Special was held with various non-competitional performances, and the thanksgiving concert was broadcast on the weekend after the Grand Showdown. This was hosted by Billy Crawford and Awra Briguela.

 Additional performance

 YFSF All Star Reunion - "Feel This Moment"

Episode hashtag
 #YFSFAllStarReunion (Saturday)
 #YFSFFinalTransformation (Sunday)

Television ratings 
Television ratings for the second season of Your Face Sounds Familiar Kids on ABS-CBN are gathered from Kantar Media. Kantar Media uses a nationwide panel size of 2,610 urban and rural homes that represent 100% of total Philippine TV viewing population. It is a multinational market research group that specializes in audience measurement in more than 80 countries.

Color keys
 Highest rating during the season
 Lowest rating during the season

Notes

References

External links
 Your Face Sounds Familiar Kids on ABS-CBN

Your Face Sounds Familiar (Philippine TV series)
2018 Philippine television seasons